Kenn Hoekstra (born October 1, 1973), is a former video game developer who worked as an executive producer for the game development company Pi Studios in Houston, Texas.  He attempted to form Category 6 Studios after leaving Pi Studios, but was unable to secure funding.  He is probably best known for his game development, marketing and promotional work as a Level Designer and Project Administrator at Raven Software in Middleton, Wisconsin where he worked from February, 1997 to June, 2004.  While employed at Raven Software, Hoekstra wrote a series of articles for Computer Games Magazine, GameSpy and two anthology books aimed at helping aspiring game developers break into game development.  Additionally, he maintains a section of his personal website dedicated to getting a job in the game development industry.

Hoekstra studied at the University of Wisconsin–Whitewater.

Kenn joined PopHorror in August, 2016 and works for the horror website as a writer and associate editor.

References

External links
Personal Website
Kenn Hoekstra's Developer Profile at MobyGames

Kenn Hoekstra's Blog
Kenn Hoekstra on Twitter
Thundarr.com A Thundarr the Barbarian fan website created by Kenn Hoekstra
Kenn Hoekstra at Muck Rack

1973 births
American video game designers
Living people
University of Wisconsin–Whitewater alumni